Stuart Young may refer to:

 Stuart Young (accountant) (1934-1986), chairman of the BBC board of governors
 Stuart Young (cricketer) (born 1938), English cricketer
 Stuart Young (footballer) (born 1972), English footballer
 Stuart Young (politician) (born 1975), Trinidad and Tobago politician